The 1st/3rd Lancers Battalion is an infantry battalion in the Land Component of the Belgian armed forces. It is an amalgamation of the former 1st Lancers Regiment and the 3rd Lancers Regiment which has been re-roled to an infantry battalion but maintains Cavalry customs and traditions. The battalion is a motorized infantry unit of the Motorized Brigade. The amalgamated unit served in Kosovo.

Organisation
The 1st/3rd Lancers Battalion comprises:
 HQ staff
 A (Red) Squadron
 B (Black) Squadron   
 C (Blue) Squadron
 D (Green) Operational Reserve Squadron
 Service (Yellow) Squadron

Lancers, 1 3
Military units and formations established in 2003
2003 establishments in Belgium
Marche-en-Famenne